Joseph F. Hudnut (1886–1968) was an American architect scholar and professor who was the first dean of Harvard University’s Graduate School of Design. He was responsible for bringing the German modernist architects Walter Gropius and Marcel Breuer to the Harvard faculty.

Education 
Hudnut was born in Big Rapids, Michigan. He received an undergraduate degree from Harvard University in 1909 and a bachelor of architecture from the University of Michigan in 1912.  He taught at Alabama Polytechnic Institute from 1912 to 1916, leaving to study at Columbia University, where he received a master of science in 1917.  During World War I, he served with the American Expeditionary Forces in Italy.

Career 
Hudnut opened an architectural practice in New York in 1919 but returned to academia in 1923, teaching architecture at the University of Virginia and serving as director of the university’s McIntyre School of Fine Arts.  Hudnut became a professor at Columbia University’s School of Architecture in 1926 and the school’s dean in 1933.  In 1936, he became dean of the newly created Graduate School of Design (GSD) at Harvard University, which brought together architecture, landscape architecture, and planning into one school; he remained dean of the GSD until retiring in 1953.

Hudnut's own architectural designs were conservative, but as an educator he promoted modern design, and in the 1930s, he brought the German modernist architects Walter Gropius—founder of the Bauhaus—and Marcel Breuer to the Harvard faculty.  Their move to the United States led to a change in American architectural education, away from historicism to an architecture that relied on craft and modern industrial techniques.

Writings 
Hudnut wrote several books on architecture and art, including “Modern Sculpture” (1929), “Architecture and the Spirit of Man” (1949), and “The Three Lamps of Modern Architecture” (1952), as well as many articles, and he continued to lecture on architecture after his retirement.

Hudnut served on the U.S. Commission of Fine Arts from 1950 to 1955.

References 

Anthony Alofsin, “The Struggle for Modernism:  Architecture, Landscape Architecture, and City Planning at Harvard” (New York:  Norton, 2002).

Joseph Hudnut, Dead; Columbia and Harvard Dean Hired Bauhaus Leaders; Obituary (“New York Times,” January 17, 1968).

Joseph Hudnut, Ex-Harvard Dean of Architecture; Obituary (“Washington Star”, January 17, 1968).

Thomas E. Luebke, ed., “Civic Art:  A Centennial History of the U.S. Commission of Fine Arts” (Washington, D.C.:  U.S. Commission of Fine Arts, 2013):  Appendix B.

1886 births
1968 deaths
Harvard University faculty
Taubman College of Architecture and Urban Planning alumni
American designers
People from Big Rapids, Michigan
Harvard University alumni
Columbia University alumni